Siam station is the cross-platform interchange station for the BTS Skytrain in Pathum Wan district, Bangkok, Thailand. It is the largest and busiest station on the BTS with 40,000–50,000 passengers per day, where passengers on the Sukhumvit and Silom Lines change trains.

Facilities
Siam station is one of two BTS stations utilising an island platform, the other being Samrong. At Siam, this is to facilitate transfer between lines. The upper level allows transfer between trains heading to Wat Phra Sri Mahathat and the National Stadium. The lower interchange level allows transfers between trains heading to Bang Wa and Kheha.

The station is located on Rama I Road to the west of Pathum Wan intersection in the heart of Siam area.  The station is linked via skybridges to the Siam Square One, Siam Paragon, Siam Center and Centerpoint of Siam Square shopping centres. It is also adjacent to Siam Square. Additionally, an elevated walkway (called Sky Walk) connects Siam station to Central World Plaza, the Ratchaprasong junction and Chit Lom station.

Station layout

Bus connections
BMTA BUS
 15: Kanlapaphruek Depot – Bang Lamphu
 16: Kamphaengphet Depot - Mochit 2 – Surawong Road
 21: Wat Khu Sang – Chulalongkorn University
 25: Pak Nam – Sanam Luang
 54: Rama 9 Depot - Huai Khwang (Loop)
 73: Siam Park Depot – Memorial Bridge
 79: Borommaratchachonnani Depot – Ratchaprasong
 141: Samae Dam Depot – Chulalongkorn University
 204: Huai Khwang – Victory Monument - Ratchawong Pier (Ordinary Bus)
 204: Huai Khwang – Din Daeng - Ratchawong Pier (Air-Conditioner Bus)
 501: Min Buri – Hua Lamphong
 508: Pak Nam – Tha Raj Woradij
Smart BUS

 40: Lam Sali - Southern Bus Terminal (Pinklao)
 48: Ramkhamhaeng University Bangna Campus - Wat Pho

CU POP BUS

 1: Sala Phrakiao - BTS Siam (Loop)
 4: Sala Phrakiao - BTS Siam - Faculty of Education

Nearby landmarks 
 Siam Square
 Scala Cinema
 Faculty of Pharmaceutical Sciences, Dentistry and Veterinary Medicine of Chulalongkorn University
 Wat Pathum Wanaram
 Royal Thai Police
 Police General Hospital

Shoppings 
 Siam Center
 Siam Discovery
 Siam Paragon
 CentralWorld

Hotels 
 Centara Grand and Bangkok Convention Centre
 Novotel Siam Square Hotel
 Siam Kempinski Hotel Bangkok
 Chatrium Hotel Grand Siam Bangkok

References

BTS Skytrain stations
Pathum Wan district
Railway stations opened in 1999
1999 establishments in Thailand